Crematogaster buddhae is a species of ant in tribe Crematogastrini. It was described by Forel in 1902. It is found across South and South-East Asia.

Distribution and Habitat 
It is found in Northeast and South India, Bangladesh, Nepal, Malaysia and Singapore.

References

buddhae
Insects described in 1902